North Stradbroke Island is a locality on part of the island of the same name in the City of Redland, Queensland, Australia.

Geography
Despite the name, the entire island is not contained within this locality as there are three other small localities around the towns of Dunwich, Amity and Point Lookout. However, most of island is within this locality.

Much of centre and south of the locality is within the Naree Budjong Djara National Park.

History

Education 
There are no schools within the locality. The nearest primary school is Dunwich State School in Dunwich.  The nearest secondary school is Cleveland District State High School in Cleveland on the mainland.

References 

Suburbs of Redland City
Localities in Queensland